Ayu-mi-x (stylized as ayu-mi-x) is the first remix album by Japanese musician Ayumi Hamasaki. It was released on March 17, 1999, to promote A Song for ××. Ayu-mi-x remix album contains 2 discs. Disc 1 is the Remix Club Side which contains dance remixes. Disc 2 is the Acoustic Orchestra Side which contains orchestral remixes and 3 dub mixes.

Track listing

Acoustic Orchestra Side 
 Prologue
 A Song for ××
 Hana
 Poker Face
 Wishing
 You
 As If...
 Powder Snow
 Depend on You
 For My Dear...
 Wishing (Refreshing Mix)
 You (Fine Mix)
 From Your Letter (Dub You Crazy Mix)

Chart positions

Total Sales: 396,800 (Japan)

References

External links
 Ayu-mi-x information at Avex Network.
 Ayu-mi-x information at Oricon.

Ayumi Hamasaki remix albums
1999 remix albums